The Heir to the Hoorah is a surviving 1916 silent film produced by Jesse Lasky and released through Paramount Pictures. It was directed by William C. deMille.

A print survives in the Library of Congress.

Cast
Thomas Meighan - Joe Lacy
Anita King - Geraldine Kent
Edythe Chapman - Mrs. Kent
Horace B. Carpenter - Bud Young
Charles Ogle - Bill Ferguson
Ernest Joy - Mr. Marshall
Joane Woodbury - Mrs. Marshall

References

External links

1916 films
American silent feature films
Paramount Pictures films
Films based on short fiction
1916 drama films
Silent American drama films
American black-and-white films
Films directed by William C. deMille
1910s American films